Opactwo   (Abbey ) is a village in the administrative district of Gmina Sieciechów, within Kozienice County, Masovian Voivodeship, in east-central Poland. 

The name of the village comes from the name of the Benedictine Abbey.

Monastery located in Opactwo, was founded by the Benedictine, brought by Sieciech from Provence. At first, it has been in the medieval city Sieciechów, but after the change of the Vistula river path, moved to a location where he stands to this day. The original location is not known. Abbey had one of the largest libraries in the country.

References

External links

 
 

Villages in Kozienice County